Plagiopholis nuchalis, commonly known as the Assam mountain snake, is a species of snake in the family Colubridae. The species is endemic to Asia.

Geographic range
P. nuchalis is found in China (Yunnan), Laos, Myanmar, and Thailand. It may possibly also be found in India (Assam) and Vietnam.

Description
Dorsally it is blackish brown, with many of the dorsal scales edged with black. On the neck there is a broad black chevron, pointing forward, to which the specific name, nuchalis, refers. Ventrally it is yellowish, marked with black.

Reproduction
P. nuchalis is oviparous.

References

External links
Flickr photo by Michael Cota
Boulenger GA (1893). Catalogue of the Snakes in the British Museum (Natural History). Volume I. Containing the Families ... Colubridæ Aglyphæ, part. London: Trustees of the British Museum (Natural History). (Taylor and Francis, printers). xiii + 448 pp. + Plates I-XXVIII. (Trirhinopholis nuchalis, new species, pp. 419–420 + Plate XXVIII, figures 1, [1a, 1b]).

Further reading
Smith MA (1943). The Fauna of British India, Ceylon and Burma, Including the Whole of the Indo-Chinese Sub-region. Reptilia and Amphibia. Vol. III.—Serpentes. London: Secretary of State for India. (Taylor and Francis, printers). xii + 583 pp. (Plagiopholis nuchalis, pp. 326–327).
Tillack, Frank; Scheidt, Ulrich; Ihle, Thomas (2006). "First record of Blakeway's mountain snake, Plagiopholis blakewayi Boulenger, 1893 from Thailand, with remarks on the distribution of Plagiopholis nuchalis Boulenger 1893 (Reptilia: Squamata: Colubridae: Pseudoxenodontidae)". Veröffentlichungen des Naturkundemuseums Erfurt 25: 181–186.

Plagiopholis
Reptiles of Myanmar
Reptiles of China
Reptiles of Laos
Reptiles of Thailand
Reptiles described in 1893
Taxa named by George Albert Boulenger